The Madcaps was an Austrian band that was founded before 1952 when it released "The Perfect Song" in Strasshof by Hans Kloiber.

The most successful songs were I man i dram, Schneemensch, and Und wem's net gfoid, der soll sich haun über d'Häusa. Georg Danzer, one of the members who wrote some of their songs, later started a solo career.

References

External links 
The Madcaps at links234.at
The Madcaps at austriancharts.at

Austrian pop music groups